The Eldik is a parliamentary faction in the 7th Jogorku Kenesh of Kyrgyzstan, consisting of single-mandate deputies elected in the 2021 parliamentary election.

History 

The group was formed at the first session of the elected parliament on 29 December 2021. Deputy Akylbek Tumonbayev became the leader of the group.

Current composition 
This list contains the current composition of the parliamentary group.

References 

Political parties in Kyrgyzstan
Political parties established in 2021